Chung Sum Wai or Tsing Chuen Wai is a walled village in Tai Hang, Tai Po District, Hong Kong.

Administration
Chung Sum Wai is one of the villages represented within the Tai Po Rural Committee. For electoral purposes, Chung Sum Wai is part of the Lam Tsuen Valley constituency, which is currently represented by Richard Chan Chun-chit.

History
At the time of the 1911 census, the population of Tai Hang Chung San Wai was 112. The number of males was 52.

See also
 Walled villages of Hong Kong
 Fui Sha Wai (Tai Po District), an nearby walled village in Tai Hang

References

External links

 Delineation of area of existing village Tai Hang (Tai Po) for election of resident representative (2019 to 2022) (includes Chung Sum Wai)

Villages in Tai Po District, Hong Kong
Walled villages of Hong Kong